Events in the year 2008 in Portugal.

Incumbents
President: Aníbal Cavaco Silva
Prime Minister: José Sócrates

Arts and entertainment
In music: Portugal in the Eurovision Song Contest 2008.

Film
From Now On released in Portugal.

Sports
Football (soccer) competitions: Primeira Liga, Liga de Honra, Taça da Liga, Taça de Portugal.

Deaths

3 January – Antônio Matias, judoka (born 1963).

21 February – Madalena Barbosa, feminist (b. 1942).

20 March – Carlos Galvão de Melo, military officer and politician (born 1921)

22 April – Francisco Martins Rodrigues, anti-Fascist resistant (b. 1927)

See also
List of Portuguese films of 2008

References

 
2000s in Portugal
Portugal
Years of the 21st century in Portugal
Portugal